Nicola Mimnagh (born c. 1985) is a Scottish beauty queen who was crowned Miss Scotland 2010 and also Miss United Kingdom 2010.

Miss Scotland
At George Square in Glasgow on 19 June 2010, Mimnagh was crowned Miss Scotland by outgoing 2009 titleholder Katharine Brown.

Miss United Kingdom
Mimnagh, who stands , represented Scotland in the 2010 Miss World pageant, finishing her participation as one of the Top 25 semifinalists.

She was named Miss United Kingdom 2010, a title she won after finishing ahead of her rivals from the other UK countries in Miss World 2010.

References

1980s births
Living people
Alumni of Glasgow Caledonian University
People from Renfrewshire
Scottish beauty pageant winners
Miss World 2010 delegates
Miss United Kingdom winners